Proto-Arabic is the name given to the hypothetical reconstructed ancestor of all the varieties of Arabic attested since the 9th century BC. There are two lines of evidence to reconstruct Proto-Arabic:

Evidence of Arabic becomes more frequent in the 2nd century BC, with the documentation of Arabic names in the Nabataean script as well as evidence of an Arabic substratum in the Nabataean language.
The Safaitic and Hismaic inscriptions were composed between the 1st century BC and the 4th century AD, in the basalt desert of the northwest Arabian Peninsula and the Southern Levant. They are also crucial to the reconstruction of Proto-Arabic, since they show many features that are shared by epigraphic Old South Arabian and Classical Arabic. The common features set them apart from languages that are documented further south, such as Dadanitic and Taymanitic (see Characteristics below).

Old Arabic in the Nabataean script is first attested in the Negev desert in the 1st century BC, but it becomes more frequent in the region after the decline of Safaitic and Hismaic. From the 4th century AD, Old Arabic inscriptions are attested from Northern Syria to the Hejaz, in a script that is intermediate between cursive Nabataean and the Kufic script of Islamic times.

The urheimat of Proto-Arabic can thus be regarded as the frontier between northwest Arabia and the southern Levant.

Characteristics
There are several features shared by Classical Arabic, the varieties of Modern Arabic and the Safaitic and Hismaic inscriptions that are unattested in any other Semitic language variety, including the Dadanitic and Taymanitic languages of the northern Hejaz. They are evidence of common descent from a hypothetical ancestor, Proto-Arabic. The following features can be reconstructed with confidence for Proto-Arabic:
 negative particles m */mā/; lʾn */lā-ʾan/ > CAr lan
 mafʿūl G-passive participle
 prepositions and adverbs f, ʿn, ʿnd, ḥt, ʿkdy
 a subjunctive in -a
 t-demonstratives
 leveling of the -at allomorph of the feminine ending
 ʾn complementizer and subordinator
 the use of f- to introduce modal clauses
 independent object pronoun in (ʾ)y
 vestiges of nunation

References

Further reading 

 . Accessed 13 Feb. 2023.
  Accessed 13 Feb. 2023.
 

Arabic language
Arabic